Simon Rea (born 18 July 1982) is a New Zealand tennis coach who works for Tennis Australia. The players he has coached include Nick Kyrgios.

Rea's highest ATP World Tour singles rank was World No. 473.

Rea received the 2013 award for Coaching Excellence, High Performance at the Newcombe Awards.

References

Sources

1982 births
Living people
New Zealand male tennis players
New Zealand tennis coaches